Iconfinder is a web company whose main product is a search engine for icons. The company was founded in 2007 by Martin LeBlanc Eigtved. Iconfinder gained popularity after a relaunch in 2009 and is now the largest icon search engine with more than 2 million unique users per month. Iconfinder received $1.5 M in funding from the Danish venture capital fund, VF Venture.

References

External links
Denmark’s startup scene heats up. Here are 5 companies to watch
Iconfinder helps designers find the right icons on the web
Sådan gør Iconfinder.com
Iværksættere får milliontilskud
Vækstfonden øjner gigantisk gevinst
29-årig droppede strandtur: Sælger ikoner for millioner

Online companies of Denmark
Graphic design 
Computer icons